The Woman Everyone Loves Is You (German: Die Frau, die jeder liebt, bist du) is a 1929 German silent film directed by Carl Froelich and starring Henny Porten, Fritz Kampers and Paul Hörbiger.

The film's sets were designed by Gustav A. Knauer and Willy Schiller.

Cast
 Henny Porten as Minny
 Fritz Kampers as Rummelhart, ihr Bräutigam
 Paul Hörbiger as Dörsterlein
 Otto Wallburg as Haucke
 Willi Forst as Picard 
 Jaro Fürth as Kolbe
 Walter Tost as Max
 Ida Krill as Frau Lehmann
 Ilse Nast as Else
 Toni Tetzlaff as Rosita Rosetta

References

Bibliography
 Hans-Michael Bock and Tim Bergfelder. The Concise Cinegraph: An Encyclopedia of German Cinema. Berghahn Books, 2009.

External links

1929 films
1929 comedy films
German comedy films
Films of the Weimar Republic
German silent feature films
Films directed by Carl Froelich
German black-and-white films
Universal Pictures films
Silent comedy films
1920s German films